Monique de Bruin (born 8 July 1965) is a retired Dutch road and track cyclist who was active between 1986 and 1993. On track, she won a bronze medal in the points race at the 1988 World Championships, whereas on the road her team was second at the 1991 UCI Road World Championships in the team time trial.

As a teenager de Bruin did skating, swimming, judo and gymnastics before turning to cycling at age 15. She took part in five Tour de France Féminin races and five road world championships. After retiring from competitions she worked as a secretary. She has two children.

References

1965 births
Living people
Dutch female cyclists
Sportspeople from Amersfoort
UCI Road World Championships cyclists for the Netherlands
Cyclists from Utrecht (province)